Dakin is a surname. Notable people with the surname include:

Alec Naylor Dakin (born 1912), cryptographer, Egyptologist and schoolmaster
Christine Dakin (born 1949), American dancer, teacher and director
Glenn Dakin (born 1960), British cartoonist and author
Henry S. Dakin, (1936–2010), American scientist, entrepreneur, publisher, cultural ambassador, peacemaker, and global communications pioneer 
Henry Drysdale Dakin (1880–1952), English chemist
Henry H. Dakin (1870–1956), provincial politician from Alberta, Canada
James H. Dakin (1806–1852), American architect
Janet Wilder Dakin (1910–1994), American philanthropist and zoologist
Jonathan Dakin (born 1973), English cricketer
Michael Dakin (born 1933), retired New Zealand Artillery officer and management consultant
Nic Dakin (born 1955), British politician
Nigel Dakin (born 1964), Soldier, Diplomat and Governor of the Turks and Caicos Islands
Thomas Dakin (cricketer) (1829–?), English cricketer
Thomas Dakin (distiller) (c.1736–c.1790), English distiller and founder of Greenall's Gin
Tim Dakin (born 1958), Bishop of Winchester, England
William H. Dakin (1816–1892), American politician in Wisconsin
William John Dakin (1883–1950), British-Australian biologist